The Egypt national under-23 football team, nicknamed The Pharaohs, is the national team of Egypt Under-23 and is administered by the Egyptian Football Association. The team's main objectives are to qualify and play at the All-Africa Games and Olympic Games. As of Tokyo 2020, players need to be born on or after 1 January 1997 but the team may be supplemented with 3 over-age players.

The Egyptian national under-23 football team have qualified for the Olympic Games 14 times, however, they withdrew from the 1956 and the 1980 tournaments after qualifying.

History
Egypt's first appearance was in Antwerp where they played one match against Italy. This was the first official international match for the Pharaohs as they lost 2–1 on August 20, 1920. Egypt would later qualify for 9 straight tournaments from 1920 to 1964. The Pharaohs achieved Fourth Place in Amsterdam 1928 and Tokyo 1964. This means that Egypt is the best team that never won a medal at the Olympics (most 4th-place finishes without a higher finish).

However, since FIFA decided to make the Olympic football an under 23-year tournament, Egypt has only qualified three times (Barcelona 1992, London 2012 and Tokyo 2020), reaching the quarterfinals in 2012.

Egypt qualified to the 2012 Olympics after beating Senegal in the Bronze Metal Match. They missed out on the 2016 Olympics but reached the 2020 Olympics.

Results and fixtures

Legend

2019

2020

2021

2022

2023

Players

Current squad
 The following players were called up for the 2023 Africa U-23 Cup of Nations qualification matches.
 Match dates: 23 and 30 October 2022
 Opposition: 
Caps and goals correct as of: 31 July 2021, after the match against

Previous squads
1920 Summer Olympics squad
1924 Summer Olympics squad
1928 Summer Olympics squad
1936 Summer Olympics squad
1948 Summer Olympics squad
1952 Summer Olympics squad
1960 Summer Olympics squad
1964 Summer Olympics squad
1984 Summer Olympics squad
1992 Summer Olympics squad
2012 Summer Olympics squad

Overage players in Olympic Games

Competitive record

Olympic Games

 Prior to the 1992 Olympic Games campaign, the Olympic football tournament was open to full senior national teams.
Egypt withdrew from the 1956 Football tournament and boycotted the 1980 Olympics after qualifying for both.

Africa U-23 Cup of Nations

African Games

 Prior to the Cairo 1991 campaign, the All-Africa Games was open to full senior national teams

References

African national under-23 association football teams
Egypt national football team